The 368th Expeditionary Air Support Operations Group is a combat support unit of the United States Air Force. The group provides overall tactical command and control of air power assets to the Joint Forces Air Component Commander and Joint Forces Commander for combat operations.

History

Tactical Air Command
The group was first activated at Shaw Air Force Base, South Carolina as the 68th Tactical Air Support Group in January 1970, when it assumed the mission, personnel and equipment of the 4467th Tactical Air Support Group, which was simultaneously discontinued.  The group trained and equipped tactical air support squadrons and tactical air control parties to control aircraft and communications systems in support of surface forces including tactical air strikes, reconnaissance and airlift. It was inactivated in 1974 and its mission transferred to the 507th Tactical Air Control Wing, which combined tactical control and tactical air support units for Ninth Air Force.

Expeditionary unit
During Operation Iraqi Freedom and Operation New Dawn it was located at an undisclosed location in Iraq (possibly Joint Base Balad). It supported Multi-National Corps - Iraq.  As of 26 July 2010, it comprised two subordinate units:
22d Expeditionary Weather Squadron
82d Expeditionary Air Support Operations Squadron
The group was inactivated on 22 December 2011 following the withdraw of US forces from Iraq and the cessation of Operation New Dawn.

In May 2015 the group was activated in support of Operation Inherent Resolve and Operation Spartan Shield.  It is currently composed of four subordinate units:
Detachment 1, Army Weather Support
Detachment 2, Air Support Operations Center
72d Expeditionary Air Support Operations Squadron
82d Expeditionary Air Support Operations Squadron

Lineage
 Established as the 68th Tactical Air Support Group on 2 December 1969
 Activated on 15 January 1970
 Inactivated on 15 June 1974
 Redesignated 368th Tactical Air Support Group on 31 July 1985
 Redesignated 368th Expeditionary Air Support Operations Group and converted to provisional status on 12 February 2009.
 Activated by 20 July 2010
 Inactivated c. 18 December 2011
 Activated May 2015

Assignments
 Ninth Air Force, 15 January 1970 – 15 June 1974
 Air Combat Command to activate or inactivate at any time on or after 12 February 2009

Components
 Air Education and Training Command Studies and Analysis Squadron, 31 August 1972 – 1 July 1974
 22d Expeditionary Weather Squadron, by July 2010 – c. 18 November 2011
 72d Expeditionary Air Support Operations Squadron, May 2015
 82d Expeditionary Air Support Operations Squadron, by July 2010 – c. 18 November 2011, May 2015
 424th Tactical Air Support Training Squadron, 1 January–31 October 1972
 681st Direct Air Support Center Squadron, 1 December 1971 – 1 July 1974
 682d Direct Air Support Center Squadron, 1 December 1971 – 1 July 1974
 703d Special Operations Squadron (later 703d Tactical Air Support Squadron), 15 January 1970 – 15 June 1974
 704th Tactical Air Support Squadron, 15 January 1970 – 15 June 1974

Aircraft
 Cessna O-2 Skymaster, 1970–1974
 Sikorsky CH-53, 1970–1973
 Sikorsky CH-3, 1970–1974
 Beechcraft QU-22 Pave Eagle, 1972
 North American Rockwell OV-10 Bronco, 1974

References

 Notes

Bibliography

Air ground operations units of the United States Air Force
Groups of the United States Air Force